Kornbluh is the surname of the following people:

 Karen Kornbluh (born 1963), American diplomat and public figure
 Felicia Kornbluh (born 1966), American professor, writer, and feminist activist
 Peter Kornbluh (born 1956), American historian
 Rebecca Kornbluh, three-time winner of the United States Open (crosswords) (1984–86)